Hitman is a stealth video game franchise created by IO Interactive. The player controls a clone assassin called Agent 47, who is assigned by the International Contract Agency to eliminate targets from around the world. Gameplay focuses heavily on a form of stealth.

The first Hitman game, Hitman: Codename 47, was developed by IO Interactive (IO), published by Eidos Interactive, and was released for Windows in 2000. It was followed by Hitman 2: Silent Assassin (2002) for GameCube, PlayStation 2, and Windows. The next game, Hitman: Contracts (2004), was released for Windows, PlayStation 2, and Xbox. Hitman: Blood Money (2006) was released for all the previous consoles and Windows, as well as the Xbox 360. After a six-year hiatus, Hitman: Absolution (2012), published by Square Enix (after their 2009 acquisition of Eidos Interactive), was released for PlayStation 3, Xbox 360, Windows, and OS X. Absolution received a polarized reception for deviating from the typical Hitman gameplay with a more linear structure.

After another hiatus, the next game, titled Hitman (2016), was released for PlayStation 4, Xbox One, and Windows. The game was released episodically, and was a soft-reboot to the series which saw the return to the typical Hitman gameplay. Two years later, Hitman 2 (2018) was released for the PlayStation 4, Xbox One, and Windows, published by Warner Bros. Interactive Entertainment, after being dropped by Square Enix, continuing the story its predecessor began. Hitman 2 dropped its episodic release, this time opting for all its content to be released at once, except for downloable content. Hitman 3 (2021), was published and developed by IO Interactive and finished the story the previous two titles set up. In 2022, IO rebranded Hitman 3 as "World of Assassination"; players of the third title are able to play the previous two games, free of charge.

Most of the games in the Hitman series feature semi-open world environments and are played from the third-person perspective, though some games include an option for first-person. Whilst controlling Agent 47, the player is tasked with assassinating various targets from around the world, with locations with a variety of non-playable characters. Players are given the freedom to complete their missions in whichever manner they wish; however, most of the time, a stealth approach is recommended. Players can make use of a variety of skills and tools to traverse each level undetected, such as taking disguises to blend in plain sight and using suppressed weaponry.

Outside of the eight mainline releases, the Hitman franchise includes three spin-off games, two novels, and a comic book miniseries. Two live-action film adaptations, Hitman (2007) and Hitman: Agent 47 (2015), share no narrative connections with the games and have been negatively received.

Games

Original series (2000–2012)

Hitman: Codename 47 

When game developer Zyrinx dissolved in 1998, the remaining team reformed themselves in Reto-Moto. That team went on to create IO Interactive (IO). IO's first intellectual property would be Hitman and they created the first game in the series titled Hitman: Codename 47. Originally, IO wanted to create a "simple shooter" titled Rex-Domonius, but the idea was scrapped by Reto-Moto.

Danish designer Jacob Anderson is responsible for the genesis of Codename 47 and its depiction of protagonist Agent 47. Anderson is quoted saying, "We decided to do a quick game inspired by Hong Kong action movies... Basically a guy in a suit blasting away in a Chinese restaurant". Soon after the initial idea was proposed, the background for Agent 47 took hold, with the idea of a genetically modified clone assassin. The concept of taking disguises from non-player characters fundamentally changed the way Hitman would be played. It became one of the first games to implement ragdoll physics.

Codename 47 was published by Eidos Interactive in 2000 and released for Windows hardware because "it was hard for us to get hold of development kits", Anderson recalls. "On top of that, 3D hardware was beginning to appear for the PC, which made it extremely interesting to develop for". The game sold over 500,000 copies to mixed reviews.

Hitman 2: Silent Assassin 

The sequel, titled Hitman 2: Silent Assassin, was developed by IO Interactive and published by Eidos Interactive for Microsoft Windows, PlayStation 2, and Xbox in October 2002, and GameCube in June 2003. Gameplay of Silent Assassin had been improved, removing the action-focused segments, and introducing features such as the option for a first-person view, the ability to incapacitate enemies instead of eliminating them, and missions with multiple possible approaches. "Now that the main platform was PS2, we felt more at home", Anderson remembers, though some players of the original were dissatisfied with the introduction of a mid-level save system. The controls were improved and the team tried to fix AI problems, but non-player characters found new ways to misbehave. "Many have tried to fix the AI since and all have failed", Anderson smiles. "It just has to have those odd moments, otherwise it wouldn't be Hitman".

Hitman: Contracts 

Hitman: Contracts was developed by IO Interactive and published by Eidos Interactive for Microsoft Windows, PlayStation 2 and Xbox in April 2004. It is both a sequel to Silent Assassin, and a remake of the first game, as it features several levels from Codename 47 that have been remastered with new graphics, better artificial intelligence, and gameplay elements introduced in the second game. This stemmed from the fact that only 10% of Silent Assassin players had played Codename 47; Anderson is quoted saying, "We decided to make Hitman 2.5 with some of the best content from [Codename 47]".

Contracts included new levels depicting some of Agent 47's past contracts not featured in any of the first two games. These contracts are told through flashbacks, which 47 experiences after being hurt during a botched job in Paris, which players get to experience in the next title being made by IO. Canonically, the story is told during the next game in the series.

Hitman: Blood Money 

Hitman: Blood Money was developed by IO Interactive and published by Eidos Interactive for Microsoft Windows, PlayStation 2, Xbox and Xbox 360 in May 2006. The game was developed alongside its predecessor and would be a direct continuation of its events, as well as starting a story beat from it, which would explain why Agent 47 was hurt at the beginning of the last game. IO and Eidos both put a lot of resources and time into Blood Money, achieving major improvements to the graphics, AI, and level design. It has been positively received and is considered a cult classic.

Hitman: Absolution 

Hitman: Absolution was announced by Square Enix, after Eidos Interactive's buyout six years prior, and it was released on November 20, 2012 worldwide for Microsoft Windows, OS X, PlayStation 3 and Xbox 360.

Before release, the developers stated that Absolution, while still a stealth game, would adopt many action game elements such as having a cinematic story-driven narrative and more emphasis on gunplay, which upset some fans.

Absolution introduced the element of 'Instinct', which allows Agent 47 to monitor enemies more easily, and an online mode called "Contracts", where players would create their own missions and share them with others online.  The game was released to mixed-positive review. Some fans of the early Hitman games were negative. On 15 May 2014, Hitman: Absolution — Elite Edition was released for OS X by Feral Interactive; it contains all previously released downloadable content, including Hitman: Sniper Challenge, a "making of" documentary, and a 72-page artbook.

World of Assassination trilogy (2016–2022)

Hitman 

A soft-reboot of the series was announced in 2015 and was published by Square Enix. Titled Hitman, the game was released in March 2016 for Microsoft Windows, PlayStation 4 and Xbox One to very positive reviews. Episodic in nature, Hitman features six levels that were released throughout 2016, one month apart from each other, along with additional content, such as "Elusive Targets", "Escalations", and user-created "Contracts" (similar to Hitman: Absolutions "Contracts" mode).

Each level is more detailed, and more complex than any previous Hitman game title. It features a different tone from its predecessors, and offers Agent 47 new ways to complete each mission. The single-player storyline follows a cohesive narrative that explores Agent 47's background, and is expanded upon in the next two titles.

Hitman 2 

Hitman 2 was announced in June 2018 by IO Interactive and Warner Bros. Interactive Entertainment, the latter of which published the game following IO's acquisition of the Hitman intellectual property from Square Enix. The game was released for Microsoft Windows, PlayStation 4, and Xbox One on 13 November 2018. Gameplay-wise, it is very similar to 2016's Hitman, but is not episodic, and introduces several features and online modes. It also deviates from its predecessor and successor, having cut scenes that are not animated.

Players had the option to carry over levels from the first game at an additional cost; if a player already owned the first game, they were able to do so free of charge, while retaining all their original progress. The storyline continues from Hitman, with 47 pursuing the Shadow Client for Providence, who in return promised to reveal his past. After discovering the Shadow Client's identity, however, 47 defects to his side and begins helping him dismantle Providence.

Hitman 3 

Hitman 3 was revealed at the PlayStation 5 reveal event in 2020, and released in January 2021 for Microsoft Windows, PlayStation 4, PlayStation 5, Xbox One, Xbox Series X/S, Stadia (originally under the title Hitman: World of Assassination before the name was used across all platforms on 26 January 2023, following the service's shutdown on 18 January 2023), and Nintendo Switch (as a cloud version), and was developed and published solely by IO Interactive, now an independent studio. Similarly to Hitman 2, Hitman 3 is not episodic, and players have the option to carry over progress from the previous two games. It features similar gameplay elements and offers mostly the same inclusions of the previous two titles. Hitman 3 includes VR support in a first for the series, with the VR support also extending to levels imported from the first two games. The narrative of the game concludes the story arc started in Hitman, as 47 and his remaining allies attempt to eliminate Providence once and for all.

In December 2021, IO Interactive announced the game's second year. This outlined additions to Hitman 3 to be released in subsequent years, including new game modes, PC VR support, ray tracing and a new map. In January 2023, IO Interactive announced that Hitman and Hitman 2 would be merged into Hitman 3, which would be renamed Hitman: World of Assassination.

Spin-offs

Hitman Go

Hitman Go is a turn based puzzle video game developed by Square Enix Montreal.  The game was released for iOS on 17 April 2014, and for Android on 4 June 2014. The Microsoft Windows and the Windows Phones version of the game was released on 27 April 2015. A "Definitive Edition" including improved visuals and all additional content was released for the PlayStation Vita, PlayStation 4 and PC via Steam on 23 February 2016.

Hitman: Sniper

Hitman: Sniper is a first-person shooter developed by Square Enix Montreal. It was released for iOS and Android on 4 June 2015. The game does not include any story elements and focuses on Agent 47 executing targets from a static location using a sniper rifle.

Hitman Sniper: The Shadows 
Hitman Sniper: The Shadows is a first-person shooter developed by Square Enix Montreal and the sequel to Hitman: Sniper. It was released for iOS and Android on 3 March 2022. It includes the same gameplay as its predecessor, without Agent 47 as a playable character.

Collections

Hitman Trilogy
A box set titled Hitman Trilogy (Hitman: The Triple Hit Pack in Europe) was released for PlayStation 2 on June 19, 2007, in North America and on June 22, 2007, in Europe by Eidos. It contains Hitman 2: Silent Assassin, Hitman: Contracts and Hitman: Blood Money. The games in the collection are identical to the previously released stand-alone versions.

Hitman HD Trilogy
The same set of titles released for the Hitman Trilogy were later released as part of a new compilation for the PlayStation 3 and Xbox 360 titled Hitman HD Trilogy, and was released on January 29, 2013, in North America, January 31, 2013 in Australia and February 2, 2013, in Europe by Square Enix. This compilation contains newly ported versions of Silent Assassin and Contracts for both consoles, as well as a new port of Blood Money for the PlayStation 3 (the Xbox 360 version was previously released as a stand-alone). A digital bundle was also released for the Xbox 360 titled Hitman HD Pack, containing just Silent Assassin and Contracts, aimed at users who already owned the stand-alone version of Blood Money for the same platform.

Hitman HD Enhanced Collection
A compilation was released for PlayStation 4 and Xbox One on 11 January 2019 worldwide by Warner Bros. Interactive Entertainment through the PlayStation Store and Xbox Store featuring new ports of Hitman: Blood Money and Hitman: Absolution for both platforms. This port promised updated graphics, 4K resolution, improved textures and lighting, as well as updated controls for both games.

Hitman Trilogy 
A digital-only collection of all the games from the World of Assassination trilogy was released on 20 January 2022 by IO Interactive. It features Hitman 3 as well as access passes to play the content from Hitman and Hitman 2 within Hitman 3. A Premium Add-Ons bundle includes all DLC for the games, excluding the "Seven Deadly Sins" DLC from Hitman 3. The Hitman Trilogy bundle is available on PlayStation 4, PlayStation 5, Xbox Series X/S, Steam and Epic Games.

Hitman: World of Assassination 
A collection titled Hitman: World of Assassination was released on January 26, 2023. It allows the importation of all 21 locations from the World of Assassination trilogy (Hitman 1, 2, and 3- including DLC of each) into Hitman 3.

The collection includes a new game mode called 'Hitman Freelancer'.

Gameplay 
Primarily from a third-person perspective, the core objective of each level in the games are to kill an assigned target(s). In most cases, Hitman allows the player different options to accomplish this task. Players can perform precise or indiscriminate assassinations in order to achieve the mission goals; the games reward a subtle approach by awarding special weapons or cash bonuses if players earn a favorable rank. In an effort to complete his assassination(s) easier, 47 can wear a variety of disguises (such as repairmen, police officers, waiters, and a plethora more) to fool his enemies and his target(s), gain access to restricted areas and accomplish tasks that would be illegal if not for wearing a disguise. The focus of Hitman is not hiding in the shadows from the enemy, but rather blending in amongst them. As such, disguises, even though they are not mandatory, are a very important element to the player in order to make their assassination run smoother.

Disguises 
Disguises are an integral part of the Hitman experience. They allow Agent 47 to access locations and areas not normally accessible without one. These locations and areas are places that help the player progress throughout the level undetected and may potentially give the player extra gear or intel. With disguises, the player can even setup certain assassinations that, again, would not be available to the player without. Some examples include: 
poisoning a target as a waiter 
eliminating a target as a trusted guard
eliminating a target while they are on an operating table as a doctor
replacing a World War I replica gun to be used in an opera rehearsal with a real World War I era pistol as an actor
Disguises are entirely optional; however, and the player can complete a mission without changing into one, albeit challenging. 
These disguises are integral to remaining undetected throughout the mission and award the player with a "Silent Assassin" mission rating.

Silent Assassin 
Remaining undetected is very important in the series. Some ways players can remain undetected are destroying camera footage/not being recorded, not eliminating non-targets, and avoiding suspicious behavior. A major feature of earlier games is the tension meter or "Suspicion Meter", (later replaced with a suspicion triangle)  detailing how much attention or suspicion the player is receiving from the public. Some suspicious activity include:
 being recorded
 using a lock pick
 un/holstering a weapon with the wrong disguise
 being seen in a restricted area with the wrong disguise or without one (World of Assassination trilogy)
 witnesses of an assassination or a body is discovered that was not an accidental kill

Instinct 
Gameplay for the most part has remained relatively unchanged since the genesis of the series. Despite this, one major inclusion to recent games was the introduction of a feature called "instinct". Instinct allows players to see through walls and discover where non-player characters and the targets are, items of interest, and items that can be interacted with. This feature was first implemented in Absolution and later revised upon in future titles. Much like disguises, a player can opt out of using this feature if they choose.

Characters

List of cast members

Reception 

The main games in the Hitman franchise have received generally positive reviews for their level design and gameplay elements. In particular the level of freedom offered to players and the unique approach to stealth gameplay. The series has received multiple awards and nominations, including several Game of the Year awards. It has also been commercially successful, selling over 15 million copies worldwide as of 2015 with the World of Assassination trilogy alone reaching over 50 million players as of November 2021.

Original series (2000–2012)
Hitman: Codename 47 received "mixed or average" reviews, according to review aggregator Metacritic. Jim Preston reviewed the PC version of the game for Next Generation, rating it three stars out of five, and calling  it "A deeply flawed masterpiece that will, nonetheless, reward forgiving gamers." Codename 47 received a "Silver" sales award from the Entertainment and Leisure Software Publishers Association (ELSPA), indicating sales of at least 100,000 copies in the United Kingdom. In April 2009, Square Enix revealed that Codename 47 had surpassed half a million sales globally.

Silent Assassin received generally positive reviews from critics, who considered it to be an improvement over its predecessor in every aspect. The game was also a commercial success, having sold more than 3.7 million copies as of 23 April 2009, which makes it the best-selling Hitman game in the original series.

Contracts was met with generally positive reviews; praise was directed at the improved gameplay elements, graphics, soundtrack, darker tone and atmosphere, while criticism was reserved for the lack of significant improvements and the familiarity with the previous two games. As of April 2009, the game has sold around 2 million copies.

Blood Money was a critical and commercial success, selling more than 2.1 million copies. It has gained a cult following and is considered by many publications and critics as one of the greatest video games of all time.

Absolution was met with a polarized reception. Most positive comments were concerning the game's graphics, environments and locations, and the varied gameplay options. However, many critics and many long time fans of the series disliked the game for its linear structure, as opposed to the open ended nature of previous installments. As of March 2013, the game had sold over 3.6 million copies, failing to reach predicted sales targets.

World of Assassination trilogy (2016–2021) 
2016's Hitman received positive reviews; critics praised the game's episodic release format, locations, level design, and its replayability but criticized the always-online requirement and excessive handholding. The game under-performed commercially and caused publisher Square Enix to divest from IO Interactive in May 2017. Despite the slow start, IO Interactive announced the game had attracted seven million players as of November 2017 and more than 13 million players had played the game by May 2018. Hitman was nominated for Best Action/Adventure Game at The Game Awards 2016 and Evolving Game at the 13th British Academy Games Awards. Video game publication Giant Bomb named Hitman their Game of the Year in 2016.

Hitman 2 was met with generally positive reviews, with most critics considering it to be an improvement over its predecessor. It debuted at tenth place in the UK's all-format sales charts. In Japan, the PlayStation 4 version sold 10,162 copies within its debut week, which made it the fifth best-selling retail game of the week in the country. The game was nominated for "Control Design, 3D" and "Game, Franchise Adventure" at the National Academy of Video Game Trade Reviewers Awards.

Hitman 3 received generally favorable reviews, with most critics regarding it as the best entry in the World of Assassination trilogy, and some even calling it the best game in the franchise to date. The game was nominated for multiple year-end awards, and won several of them, including "PC Game of the Year" at the 2021 Golden Joystick Awards. Hitman 3 was also the most commercially successful of the franchise, selling 300% better than Hitman 2 and making back its development costs in only a week.

Collections

This collection was a boxset that was released in 2007 and included three of the original Hitman titles. Hitman 2: Silent Assassin, Hitman: Contracts, and Hitman: Blood Money were all sold in this boxset together and it was released on the PS2. Just like the original releases of the games, the bundle was received positively.

This HD collection was released on PlayStation 4 and Xbox One. It includes an Xbox 360 port of Hitman: Blood Money to both the consoles and an HD remaster of Hitman: Absolution. Both games were released on 4K with 60fps, has texture and lighting improvements, and introduces updated controls for a "...more fluid experience". This bundle received a mixed-positive review as noted by PlayStation Country, who gave the score a 7/10: "As a remaster, Hitman HD Enhanced Collection does deliver the best looking edition of these games to consoles. If either of these titles are missing from your Hitman collection, it's worth a look".

Spin-offs 

Following its announcement, Hitman Go was met with some skepticism from critics. However, the game received a positive reception with praise for the art, aesthetics, simple gameplay mechanics, and translation of Hitman to a mobile device. It received several nominations and awards from gaming publications and award organizations.

Hitman: Sniper was met with generally favorable reviews. Some reviewers praised the cleverness and minimalism of its puzzle design, but wanted more variety from its activity-dense scenarios.

Other media

Films 
A film adaptation of the game series was released in 2007. The film, titled Hitman, is set in a separate continuity from the game series, directed by Xavier Gens and starring Timothy Olyphant as Agent 47. Executive producer Vin Diesel was originally cast to play Agent 47 but was replaced for unknown reasons. The film also stars Dougray Scott, Robert Knepper, Ulrich Thomsen and Michael Offei. In the film, the International Contract Agency is replaced by a similar group called the Organization, which, like the ICA, benefits from ties to various government agencies, is neutral in global matters and morality, and performs missions all over the world. Unlike the game wherein the hitmen are contracted from a range of backgrounds, the Organization instead recruits orphans and trains them from an early age.

A reboot was planned but Olyphant stated on the Nerdist podcast that he had no interest in returning for a sequel and only did the original film in order to pay for his new house following the sudden cancellation of Deadwood.

On 5 February 2013, it was reported that the film series was being rebooted with the title Hitman: Agent 47, directed by Aleksander Bach. Screenwriter of the original film, Skip Woods, wrote the screenplay with Mike Finch and starring Rupert Friend as 47 after Paul Walker, was originally 
cast, was killed in a car crash on 30 November 2013. The film also stars Zachary Quinto, Hannah Ware, Thomas Kretschmann, Dan Bakkedahl and Ciarán Hinds.

In 2015, Hitman film producer Adrian Askarieh stated that he hoped to oversee a film universe with Just Cause, Hitman, Tomb Raider, Deus Ex, and Thief, but admitted that he does not have the rights to Tomb Raider. In May 2017, the Game Central reporters at Metro UK suggested that the shared universe was unlikely, pointing out that no progress had been made on any Just Cause, Deus Ex nor Thief films.

Television series

In November 2017, Hulu and Fox 21 Television Studios announced it would produce a television series based on the game. Derek Kolstad, Adrian Askarieh and Chuck Gordon would serve as its executive producers. The pilot episode would be written by Kolstad. Kolstad has stated that his adaption of Agent 47 will differ slightly from that of the vision IO has already made. Despite being announced in 2017, he does not know when the TV series will start filming.

Literature

William C. Dietz wrote the first novel in the Hitman book series, titled Hitman: Enemy Within. It was released on August 28, 2007, and published by Del Rey Books. Set between the events of 2002's Hitman 2: Silent Assassin and 2004's Hitman: Contracts, the novel centers around the Franchise (the main antagonists of the 2006 game Hitman: Blood Money), a rival contract killing organization that is trying to take down 47's employers, the ICA.

The second novel in the Hitman book series, Hitman: Damnation, was written by Raymond Benson and was published on October 30, 2012. It serves as a tie-in and prequel to the 2012 game, Hitman: Absolution.

IO Interactive partnered with Dynamite Entertainment to create Agent 47: Birth of the Hitman, a six-issue comic book miniseries that ran from November 2017 to June 2018, and was later released as a graphic novel in 2019. The series ties-in with the World of Assassination trilogy and depicts 47's life before the events of the games, including his upbringing at Dr. Ort-Meyer's asylum and his previous career as a brainwashed assassin for Providence alongside his best friend, Lucas Grey / Subject 6. IO Interactive had complete control over the storyline of the comic.

Future 
In various interviews conducted with IO Interactive, they have confirmed that despite Hitman 3 being the final game in the World of Assassination trilogy, it will not be the last game in the franchise.

References

External links
Official Hitman website

 
Stealth video games by series
Fiction about assassinations
Cloning in fiction
Stealth video games
Video games about crime
Video game franchises
Video game franchises introduced in 2000
Video games adapted into comics
Video games adapted into films
Video games adapted into novels